Esch may refer to:

 Esch (surname)
 Esch-sur-Alzette, the second largest city in Luxembourg
 Esch-sur-Sûre, a village in Luxembourg
 Esch, Bernkastel-Wittlich, a municipality in the district Bernkastel-Wittlich, Rhineland-Palatinate, Germany 
 Esch, Vulkaneifel, a municipality in the district Vulkaneifel, Rhineland-Palatinate, Germany 
 Esch, Netherlands, a former municipality now part of the municipality of Haaren
 ESCH, NASDAQ symbol for Eschelon Telecom, Inc.